Looser Than Clams... A Historical Retrospective is a retrospective compilation album by Zoogz Rift, released in December 1986 by SST Records.

Track listing

Personnel 
Marc Mylar – engineering
Zoogz Rift – vocals, guitar, arrangement, production

Release history

References

External links 
 Looser Than Clams... A Historical Retrospective (Greatest Hits, Vol. 1) at Discogs (list of releases)

1986 compilation albums
SST Records compilation albums
Zoogz Rift albums